Daniel Stensland (born 24 September 1989, in Fauske, Salten) is a Norwegian footballer who currently plays for Levanger.

He made his debut against SK Brann in April 2009. Born in Fauske, Stensland has played for Fauske/Sprint in the Norwegian Third Division in 2006 and 2007, before he transferred to Bodø/Glimt in 2008.

Career statistics

References

1989 births
Living people
People from Fauske
Norwegian footballers
FK Bodø/Glimt players
Eliteserien players
Norwegian First Division players
Association football wingers
Sportspeople from Nordland